The Swift Building is a historic commercial building at 410 East Broad Street in Texarkana, Arkansas.  It is a two-story brick building, with a distinctive brick parapet topped by cast concrete.  The main facade has a central doorway, with a series of three sash windows on the right and a recessed loading bay on the left.  The building was built c. 1920 by the Swift Meat Company, and is a well-preserved example of a meat packing facility from the period, and a good example of vernacular commercial architecture.

The building was listed on the National Register of Historic Places in 2008.

See also
National Register of Historic Places listings in Miller County, Arkansas

References

Buildings designated early commercial in the National Register of Historic Places in Arkansas
Buildings and structures in Texarkana, Arkansas
National Register of Historic Places in Miller County, Arkansas
Commercial buildings completed in 1920